Płonia-Śmierdnica-Jezierzyce is a municipal neighbourhood of the city of Szczecin, Poland, situated on the right bank of Oder river, south-east of the Szczecin Old Town, and Middle Town. As of January 2011 it had a population of 3,933.

Płonia-Śmierdnica-Jezierzyce comprises Płonia, Śmierdnica, and Jezierzyce.

References 

Neighbourhoods of Szczecin